Henry Duesbury (a relative of the Duesbury family of Royal Crown Derby fame) was the Borough Architect for Derby from 1841 to about 1854. He designed the Derby Guildhall, the Arboretum Square entrance and orangery, and the so-called Crystal Palace at the Derby Arboretum.
There are a number of other important buildings within the city of Derby also designed by Duesbury including the county asylum (built 1849–51) which became known as the Pastures Hospital in Mickleover and is now converted into flats.

References

Architects from Derby
19th-century English architects